Operation Corkscrew was the codename for the Allied invasion of the Italian island of Pantelleria (between Sicily and Tunisia) on 11 June 1943, prior to the Allied invasion of Sicily, during the Second World War. There had been an early plan to occupy the island in late 1940 (Operation Workshop), but it was aborted when the Luftwaffe strengthened the Axis air strength in the region.

Background
The Allied focus returned to Pantelleria in early 1943. The radar installations and airfield on the island were seen as a real threat to the planned invasion of Sicily (codenamed Operation Husky). The Italian garrison on the island was 12,000 strong in well-entrenched pillboxes and 21 gun batteries of a variety of calibres. In addition, there was an opportunity to assess the impact of bombardment upon heavily fortified defences. It was decided to see if the island could be forced into submission by aerial and naval bombardment alone. Failing this, an amphibious invasion was planned for 11 June.

Landings
Starting in late May, the island was subjected to steadily increasing bombing attacks. In early June, the attacks intensified and 14,203 bombs weighing 4,119 tons were dropped on 112 Italian batteries. On 8 June, a Royal Navy task force of five cruisers, eight destroyers and three torpedo boats carried out a bombardment of the main port on the island.

The engagement was observed by General Dwight D. Eisenhower, the Supreme Allied Commander in the Mediterranean, and Admiral Andrew Cunningham from the flagship HMS Aurora. From 8 May to 11 June 5,285 bombing sorties were flown by fighter-bombers, medium and heavy bombers, dropping a total of 6,202 tons of bombs on the island. 

Two demands for the garrison to surrender went unanswered and, on 11 June, the amphibious assault went ahead. About an hour before the landing craft reached the beaches, the accompanying ships opened fire. Unknown to the attackers, the commander of the garrison Adm. Gino Pavesi on Pantelleria had sought permission to surrender from Rome the previous evening and received it that morning. When the first of the British Commandos landed, the Italians had already surrendered, therefore no fight was necessary.

Aftermath
As typed at page 79 of Rogers, Edith C. (1947) monograph "The Reduction of Pantelleria and Adjacent Islands, 8 May-14 June 1943" by 52 US Air Force, Air Force Historical Research Agency the gun positions were reduced to 47% effectiveness by the intense ten-day air bombardment. Out of 112 guns bombed, only 2 had suffered from direct hits, 17 were near misses and 34 were damaged by debris and splinters (10 beyond repair). All control communications were destroyed, along with many gun emplacements and ammunition stores;

As typed at page 76 of Rogers, Edith C. (1947) monograph "The Reduction of Pantelleria and Adjacent Islands, 8 May-14 June 1943" by 52 US Air Force, Air Force Historical Research Agency, heavy bombers had an accuracy of 3,3%, medium bombers 6,4% and light fighters-bombers 2,6%.

The Italian garrisons on other nearby islands (Lampedusa and Linosa) quickly fell over the next few days. The operation cleared the way for the invasion of Sicily a month later.

References

External links
 Detailed American description, 320th Bomb Group
 British Combined Operations description

Corkscrew
Corkscrew
June 1943 events
Corkscrew
Corkscrew